Agdistis varii is a moth in the family Pterophoridae. It is known from South Africa (Mpumalanga, Limpopo) and Zimbabwe.

The wingspan is 16–20 mm. The forewings are grey with two dark dots, one in discal area and another at the costal margin. The hindwings are grey without markings. Adults are on wing from February to May.

Etymology
The species is named after Dr L. Vari, head of the Lepidoptera Department, Transvaal Museum (Pretoria).

References

Agdistinae
Moths of Africa
Moths described in 2009